Fords Branch is an unincorporated community located in Pike County, Kentucky, United States. It was settled by Joseph Ford and his family just following the American Revolutionary War. Ford was a lieutenant in the North Carolina militia; his descendants still live there. Captain William Ford served during the Civil War and named Fords Branch for his wife, Malinda McGee Ford. The original name of Malinda Ford's Branch was shortened when the US Post Office was established in January 1903.

References

Unincorporated communities in Pike County, Kentucky
Unincorporated communities in Kentucky